Eupithecia pediba is a moth in the family Geometridae. It is found in eastern Tibet (Sichuan), and Yunnan, China. It occurs at a high altitude, between 4000 and 5000 meters above sea level, and is on wing from mid-June to mid-July. 

Adults are pale brown with dark brown markings and have elongated wings compared to many other species of Eupithecia. In external appearance, specimens resemble Eupithecia molestissima, from which it differs in the shade of the costal half of the hindwings. The genitals resemble those of Eupithecia lariciata.

References

Moths described in 1981
pediba
Moths of Asia